Lanier School may refer to:
 Lanier Middle School (disambiguation)
 Lanier High School (disambiguation)